Sue Tompkins is a British visual and sound artist based in Glasgow. She was the vocalist for indie rock band Life Without Buildings.

Biography
Tompkins was born in Leighton Buzzard in 1971. She studied painting at the Glasgow School of Art, and graduated in 1994. Since 1997 she has worked collaboratively with the collective Elizabeth Go (Victoria Morton, Sarah Tripp, Hayley Tompkins and Cathy Wilkes). She has held multiple exhibitions at The Modern Institute.

Sue Tompkins uses the spoken and written word delivered in a deceptively simple and direct fashion. The written word comes first: she accumulates copious notes over a period of time then edits and refines them to create disjointed yet succinct texts that combine repeated words with constructed phrases to evoke imagery, emotion and ideas.
Tompkins had an interesting way of coming to her unique style of work in art school:"I studied painting. And then by the fourth year at Glasgow School of Art, I remember really thinking, I really don’t know what to paint. I really have no idea. I just don’t know what I’m doing. There was a patch where I remember thinking, god, I just want to go and sit in the library and look at stuff. I was really into looking at art. I really liked looking at art books. So my degree show ended up being this big tissue paper installation, really quite big on the wall. I used to go the library and they had these little rooms that you could book. And I used to just book a room and take a massive stack of books off the shelves, really random, but everything I liked – it could be Frieze magazine or Artforum or it could be Picasso’s greatest hits. I would go into this little room and I had a dictaphone and I used to just record myself looking."Tompkins also works in a performance medium. Much like her visual and sound-based works, her performances utilise the practice of language, ephemera and live situations.

Tompkins also provided the vocals for art rock band Life Without Buildings, along with other students of the Glasgow School of Art. Spin magazine described Tompkins' vocals as "nervously chirped evocative phrases" and credited her as the band's central attraction. Following their debut album Any Other City in 2001, the band split up.

Her twin sister is the artist Hayley Tompkins.

Tompkins lives and works in Glasgow.

Exhibitions
 The Showroom, London (solo, 31 October - 9 December 2007)
 'Bare Words', Lautom Contemporary, Oslo (group, October 2007)
 'in the poem about love you don't write the word love', installation and live performance, Overgaden, Copenhagen (November, 2007)
 Sue Tompkins, Inverleith House, Royal Botanic Garden Edinburgh, (solo, 27 February - 24 April 2011)
 'Expressions', The Modern Institute, Glasgow, (solo, 7 September - 2 November 2013)
 'When Wayne Went Away', Lisa Cooley, New York, (solo, 21 February - 27 March 2016)

References

1971 births
British  women artists
Living people
People from Leighton Buzzard
British twins
21st-century British  women singers
Women sound artists